Richard Mulvaney (born 5 August 1942) is an English footballer who played as a central defender in the Football League.

References

External links
Dick Mulvaney's Career
Premier League Official Site

1942 births
Living people
English footballers
Footballers from Sunderland
Association football defenders
Billingham Synthonia F.C. players
Blackburn Rovers F.C. players
Oldham Athletic A.F.C. players
Rochdale A.F.C. players
Gateshead F.C. players
English Football League players